This is a summary of the electoral history of Narendra Modi, who is the incumbent Prime Minister of India since 2014 and served as the Chief Minister of Gujarat from 2001 to 2014. He currently represents Varanasi as a Member of Parliament in Lok Sabha, the lower house of the Indian parliament.

He contested his first election in February 2002 by-election to the Gujarat Legislative Assembly from the Rajkot II constituency. Later that year in 2002 elections he contested from Maninagar and won. He was re-elected from Maninagar in 2007 and 2012 and represented the constituency till 2014 when he became the Prime Minister of India.

In 2014, Modi contested for the two Lok Sabha constituencies: Varanasi and Vadodara. He won in both constituencies, defeating Aam Aadmi Party leader Arvind Kejriwal in Varanasi and Madhusudan Mistry of the Indian National Congress in Vadodara. To comply with the law that an elected representative cannot represent more than one constituency, he vacated the Vadodara seat. In 2019 he was again re-elected from Varanasi.

Election results

Parliamentary elections

General election 2019

General election 2014

Legislative Assembly elections

2012

2007

December 2002

February 2002

See also
Electoral history of Atal Bihari Vajpayee

References

Electoral history of Indian politicians
Narendra Modi